Mosley may refer to:

Mosley (film), 2019 New Zealand animated film
Mosley (TV serial), 1998 British television miniseries
Mosley (surname), includes a list of people with the surname
Mosley Mayne (1889–1955), British military officer
Mosley Street, street in Manchester, England

See also
Moseley (disambiguation)